Hedges is an English surname. Notable people with the surname include:

 Andrew H. Hedges (born 1966), American church historian
 Anthony Hedges (born 1931), British composer
 Ariel Serena Hedges Bowen, American writer
 Austin Hedges (born 1992), American professional baseball player
 Benjamin Hedges (1907-1969), American athlete
 Bernard Hedges (1927–2014), Welsh cricketer
 Carol Hedges, British writer
 Charles Hedges (1649-1714), English judge
Charlie Hedges, radio presenter and DJ
 Chris Hedges (born 1956), American journalist
 Chuck Hedges (1932–2010), American jazz clarinetist
 Elaine Ryan Hedges (1927–1997), American feminist
 F. A. Mitchell-Hedges (1882-1959), British explorer and writer
 Florence Hedges (1878–1956), American plant pathologist and botanist
 Fred Paul Hedges (1921-1999), American guitar maker
 Frederick Hedges (1903-1989), Canadian rower
 Frederick William Hedges (1896-1954), British soldier
 George Hedges (1952-2009), American lawyer
 James Hedges (born 1939), American prohibitionist
 Jane Hedges (born 1956), Anglican priest
 Jared Hedges (born 1980), American screenwriter
 Jimmy Hedges (1942–2014), American wood carver and art dealer
 Job E. Hedges (1862–1925), American lawyer and politician from New York
 Joe Hedges (born 1980), American musician and visual artist
 John C. Hedges, American football coach
 John Hedges (English politician, died 1562)
 John Hedges (English politician, died 1737), MP for Mitchell, Fowey and Bossiney
 John Hedges, musician with Carol Lou Trio
 John Hedges (British governor), first acting governor of British East Florida, 20–30 July 1763  
 John Hedges (archaeologist), British archaeologist and editor of British Archaeological Reports
 Larry V. Hedges, American statistician
 Lee Hedges (born 1929), American football coach
 Lionel Hedges (1900–1933), English amateur first-class cricketer
 Lucas Hedges (born 1996), American actor
 Mark Hedges (born 1964), British journalist
 Martyn Hedges (died 1992), British canoeist
 Matt Hedges, American soccer player
 Matthew Hedges (born 1986/87), British academic
 Michael Hedges (1953-1997), American guitarist
 Mike Hedges, British record producer
 Peter Hedges (born 1962), American writer
 Robert E. M. Hedges, British archaeologist
 Robert Hedges (colonial administrator), British administrator
 Robert Hedges (baseball) (1869-1932), American baseball executive
 Robert Yorke Hedges (1903–1963), British expatriate judge who was Chief Justice of Sarawak from 1946 to 1951
 Robbie Hedges, chief of the Peoria tribe of Indians of Oklahoma
 Ryan Hedges (born 1995), Welsh footballer
 Sid G. Hedges (1897-1974), British author
 Stephen Blair Hedges, (born 1957), American evolutionary biologist 
 William Hedges (colonial administrator) (1632-1701), British merchant
 William Hedges (Australian politician) (1856-1935), Australian politician
 William Hedges (New South Wales politician) (1881–1962), Australian politician
 William Hedges-White, 3rd Earl of Bantry

Fiction
 Reverend Hedges, fictional character in Wallace and Gromit

See also
 Hedge (surname)
 Hedge (disambiguation)

English-language surnames